Narcotango vol. 2 is a studio album by Argentine Carlos Libedinsky.

Track listing 

2006 albums
Carlos Libedinsky albums